Peptoniphilus methioninivorax is a Gram-positive and strictly anaerobic bacterium from the genus of Peptoniphilus which has been isolated from ground beef from Farmington in the United States.

References 

Bacteria described in 2011
Eubacteriales